Ditazole is a non-steroidal anti-inflammatory agent with analgesic and antipyretic activity similar to phenylbutazone. It is also a platelet aggregation inhibitor which is marketed in Spain and Portugal under the trade name Ageroplas.

References 

Oxazoles
Antiplatelet drugs
Ethanolamines